Turning Point is the first studio album by Nigerian artiste Dr SID, released April 11, 2010, on Mo' Hits Records. Production for the album took place during 2009 at Mo' Hits recording studios and was handled by Don Jazzy

Background 
In April 2009, following the release of Wande Coal's debut album Mushin to Mo'Hits, Don Jazzy began work on Dr SID's album. Don Jazzy decided to create a new sound for Dr SID who was known as predominantly a Rap artiste and decided to have more singing on the album, as well as giving the album Pop feel. The inspiration behind the album was to create music that described "love" and "dance", two emotion that bring joy to most people, as well as introduce listeners to the new sound of Dr SID. The intent to introduce this new sound led to the Title of the album "Turning Point", which basically describes the transition of Dr SID's music and life as a whole.

Recording 
Most of the album's recording sessions took place in Lagos at the Mo' Hits Recording Studio, the first song to be recorded on the album was "Baby"

Release and promotion 
The first set of singles (Something about you, Winchi winchi and Pop Something) off the album were released in September 2009 online at Dr SID's official website and his Reverbnation page, The videos for Something about you and Pop something were released in October 2009 and May 2010 respectively and received mixed reviews. Dr SID then embarked on a 6 state club tour around Nigeria to promote the release of the album.

Accolades
Turning Point was nominated for the "Best R&B/Pop Album" award at the 2011 edition of The Headies.

Reception 

The initial reviews were not very good as most people expected to hear a hip hop album and Dr SID's change in style was not welcome by a lot of his fans. Dr SID was described as a sell out, going pop on most of the songs on the album. The follow-up singles Pop Something and Over the moon, helped to improve the rating of the album.

Track listing

References

External links 
  at iTunes
  360 Nobs
  The Net Ng
  PM NEWS

2010 albums
Albums produced by Don Jazzy
Dr SID albums